Barry Layne Switzer (born October 5, 1937) is a former American football coach and player. He served for 16 years as head football coach at the University of Oklahoma and four years as head coach of the Dallas Cowboys of the National Football League (NFL). He won three national championships at Oklahoma, and led the Cowboys to win Super Bowl XXX against the Pittsburgh Steelers. He has one of the highest winning percentages of any college football coach in history, and is one of only three head coaches to win both a college football national championship and a Super Bowl, the others being Jimmy Johnson and Pete Carroll.

Early life and career 
Switzer was born on October 5, 1937, in Crossett, Arkansas, to parents Frank Mays Switzer and Mary Louise Switzer. Barry and his younger brother, Donnie, were at home in rural Ashley County, Arkansas with their mother and father when, in early February 1954, it was raided by the Arkansas Alcoholic Beverage Control Commission and the Arkansas State Police. The commission and the State Police found untaxed contraband liquor in the home. Frank made bond but was later tried and convicted of illegal trafficking in alcohol for purposes of re-sale ("bootlegging"). He was sentenced to a term of five years in prison, but that conviction was reversed upon appeal. Frank did serve five months of that term, and as a result, missed seeing Barry play his senior season of high school football.

Barry and his brother Donnie were at home with their mother when on August 26, 1959, she took her life by her own hand with a .38 caliber pistol on the back porch. On November 16, 1972, after Barry and his brother had each commenced their professional careers, their father was murdered by a jealous lover.

Barry accepted an athletic scholarship and played football at the University of Arkansas, where he joined Pi Kappa Alpha. During his senior season of 1959, he was one of the Razorbacks' "Tri-Captains", leading Arkansas to a 9–2 record, a share of the Southwest Conference championship, a victory over Georgia Tech in the 1960 Gator Bowl, and a No. 9 final ranking in the polls, all in Frank Broyles second season as head coach. After graduation, he did a brief stint in the U.S. Army and then returned to Arkansas as an assistant coach under Broyles.

University of Oklahoma 
Following the 1966 season, Switzer moved to the University of Oklahoma as an assistant coach under new head coach and good friend, Jim Mackenzie. After Mackenzie died of a heart attack following spring practice of 1967, Switzer continued as an assistant under former University of Houston assistant and new Oklahoma head coach Chuck Fairbanks.

Switzer made a name for himself when he was OU's offensive coordinator by perfecting the wishbone offense and developing it into the most prolific rushing offense in college football history. Under Switzer, the Sooners set an NCAA rushing record of 472 yards per game in 1971 and scored over 500 points in two different seasons, 1971 and 1986. When Fairbanks accepted the position of head coach of the New England Patriots following the 1972 season, Switzer was the obvious choice to succeed him.

Switzer became head coach at Oklahoma in 1973. Prior to Fairbanks' departure, he interviewed for the vacant head coaching positions at Michigan State and SMU. He was so successful that by his seventh season in 1979, the St. Petersburg Times wrote that Switzer was the high priest of what Billy Sims, who won the Heisman Trophy in 1978, described as the church of OU football. Switzer led the team to undefeated seasons in 1973 and 1974. Oklahoma won national championships in 1974, 1975 and 1985 under Switzer's leadership. The team won or shared in the Big Eight Conference championship every year from 1973 to 1980. During his sixteen years as head coach at Oklahoma, his teams won eight of the thirteen post-season bowl games they played in, and 54 of his players were selected as All-Americans.

In 1983, Switzer was sued by the U.S. Securities and Exchange Commission (SEC) for an alleged civil violation of the laws prohibiting insider trading of securities. He defended himself as having innocently overheard the information while lounging on the bleacher behind some corporate insiders—at a stadium where Switzer was watching his elder son compete in a track meet.  The case was tried in Oklahoma City United States District Court (before a special U.S. District Judge appointed from Kansas). The case was dismissed at the conclusion of the Government's case for its failure to demonstrate that there had been any purposeful disclosure to Switzer.

In 1989, Oklahoma was placed on probation by the NCAA amidst several scandals involving Oklahoma players, including Charles Thompson's arrest for soliciting cocaine to undercover FBI agents. One of the players Switzer and his staff illegally paid money to was Hart Lee Dykes. OU booster, Bill Lambert, illegally paid between 100 and 150 OU football players. OU recruiting coordinator, Shirley Vaughan, illegally paid dozens of OU football players through a ticket scalping scheme. OU 1985 national championship members Keith Jackson, Jamelle Holieway and Brian Bosworth all openly admitted to accepting illegal payments during their time at OU. [5][6] In 1989, after sixteen years as Oklahoma's head coach, Switzer chose to resign. Switzer succeeded in getting the better of several famous contemporaries, including a 12–5 mark against Tom Osborne, 5–3 against Jimmy Johnson, 3–0 against Bobby Bowden, 3-0-1 against Darrell Royal and 1–0 against Joe Paterno, Bo Schembechler, and Woody Hayes.  Along with Bennie Owen, Bud Wilkinson, and Bob Stoops, he is one of four coaches to win over 100 games at the University of Oklahoma. No other college football program has had more than three coaches accomplish such a feat.

Switzer was known as an outstanding recruiter of high school talent, particularly in the neighboring state of Texas. His record against Texas in his sixteen seasons as Oklahoma's head coach is 9–5–2. The 1984 game between these two universities ended in a 15–15 tie by virtue of a field goal by Texas on the last play of the game. On the next to last play of the game, however, there had been an apparent interception of a Texas pass thrown into the end zone by Oklahoma's Keith Stansberry. The pass was, however, ruled incomplete by a Southwest Conference official and the interception waved off. Bruce Finlayson, Supervisor of Officials for the 1984 game later admitted, as reported in the Daily Oklahoman newspaper the following Monday, October 15, 1984, that the officiating crew had made an error in not confirming Oklahoma's interception. The correct call would have preserved a 15–12 Oklahoma victory and changed Switzer's record against Texas to 10–5–1. Switzer has a 3–0–1 record against UT-Austin's Darrell Royal, a 4-5-1 record against UT-Austin's Fred Akers and a 2–0 mark against that university's David McWilliams.

Dallas Cowboys 
Switzer resurfaced in coaching in 1994 with the Dallas Cowboys. Switzer stepped in following the departure of Jimmy Johnson, who as head coach had won the previous two Super Bowls. Johnson had clashed with owner Jerry Jones and many felt that Switzer was more apt to go along with Jones' ideas. Switzer was successful with the Cowboys, going 12–4 his first season in 1994 (losing to the 49ers in the NFC Championship). However, in the game he was criticized for making two critical errors. In the first half, with the Cowboys down 24–14, he opted not to run out the clock, giving the 49ers a chance to score one last touchdown before the half ended. Later, in the fourth quarter, with the Cowboys still down 38–28 and trying to rally, he was penalized for touching an official with his hip while demonstrating what he felt had been San Francisco's Deion Sanders committing pass interference against Dallas' Michael Irvin—which had not been called. This ended the Cowboys' chances of a comeback.

In Switzer's second season of 1995, the team went 12–4. Dallas won Super Bowl XXX over the Pittsburgh Steelers, 27–17, making Switzer one of only three coaches to win a college national championship and a Super Bowl, the others being Johnson and Pete Carroll.

In August 1997, Switzer was arrested after a loaded .38-caliber revolver was found in his luggage at the Dallas/Fort Worth International Airport. Switzer, who was returning to the team's training camp facility in Austin, said there were children at his Dallas home and he put the gun in his bag to hide it from them. He said he accidentally forgot to remove the gun from the bag before heading to the airport. Switzer pleaded guilty, was fined $3,500, and was given one year deferred adjudication. Two days later, he was fined $75,000 by Jones. After a disappointing 6–10 season in 1997, Switzer resigned as head coach of the Cowboys with a 40–24 career NFL coaching record.

After coaching 
In late 2000, Switzer was initiated as an honorary member of the Oklahoma Kappa chapter of Sigma Alpha Epsilon. Switzer was elected to the College Football Hall of Fame in 2002. In 2004, he received the Jim Thorpe Lifetime Achievement Award. Switzer still resides in Norman, Oklahoma with his wife Becky. In August 2007, XMSN added Switzer as a part of the channel's expanded college sports coverage. On September 9, 2007, Switzer joined the Fox NFL Pregame show. Switzer got into acting after coaching, playing the part of the head coach of the Prattville Pirates in the 1998 movie Possums. Switzer also guest-starred in an episode of TNT's Saving Grace titled "Do You Love Him?", which first aired August 11, 2008. In 2006, Switzer and Toby Keith helped found First Liberty Bank in Oklahoma City. He owns Switzer's Locker Room, Switzer's Vineyards, and a number of other small businesses in the Norman area.

Head coaching record

College

National Football League

Coaching tree 
Head coaches under whom Switzer served:

 Frank Broyles: Arkansas (1961–1965)
 Jim Mackenzie: Oklahoma (1966)
 Chuck Fairbanks: Oklahoma (1967–1972)

Assistant coaches under Barry Switzer who became NCAA or NFL head coaches:

 Tim Billings: Southeast Missouri State (2000–2005), Southern Mississippi (2020)
 John Blake: Oklahoma (1996–1998)
 Mack Brown: Appalachian State (1983), Tulane (1985–1987), North Carolina (1988–1997, 2019–), Texas (1998–2013)
 Dave Campo: Dallas Cowboys (2000–2002)
 Jim Donnan: Marshall (1990–1995), Georgia (1996–2000)
 Donnie Duncan: Iowa State (1979–1982)
 Gary Gibbs: Oklahoma (1989–1994)
 Galen Hall: Florida (1984–1989)
 Larry Lacewell: Arkansas State (1979–1989)
 Brad Lambert: Charlotte (2011–2018)
 Wendell Mosley: Texas Southern (1976–1978)
 Jerry Pettibone: Northern Illinois (1985–1990), Oregon State (1991–1996)
 Charlie Sadler: Northern Illinois (1991–1995)
 Mike Shanahan: Los Angeles Raiders (1988–1989), Denver Broncos (1995–2008), Washington Redskins (2010–2013)
 Mike Zimmer: Minnesota Vikings (2014–2021)

References

External links 

 Voices of Oklahoma interview with Barry Switzer. First person interview conducted on August 17, 2009, with Barry Switzer.
 

1937 births
American football centers
American football linebackers
Arkansas Razorbacks football coaches
Arkansas Razorbacks football players
Coaches of American football from Arkansas
College football announcers
College Football Hall of Fame inductees
Dallas Cowboys head coaches
Living people
National Football League announcers
NCAA sanctions
Oklahoma Sooners football coaches
People from Crossett, Arkansas
Sportspeople from Norman, Oklahoma
Super Bowl-winning head coaches